Condado is an oceanfront, tree-lined, pedestrian-oriented upper middle to upper class community in Santurce. It is one of the forty subbarrios of Santurce in San Juan, Puerto Rico.

Setting
Condado is an upscale neighborhood located on the beach. It is located east of the historic colonial barrio of Old San Juan. It is one of 40 subbarrios of Santurce. The land area measures  with a resident population of 6,170 according to the 2000 United States Census.

The eastern border is marked by De Diego Avenue and its straight extension towards the Atlantic coast. On the south, the subbarrio is bounded by Wilson Street, Aldea Street, Expreso Baldorioty de Castro, Piccioni Street and Delcasse Street, and by the Condado Lagoon (from east to west). At the westernmost point is the Dos Hermanos Bridge, where Ashford Avenue ends and leads into Old San Juan. In the north are the beaches of the Atlantic Ocean next to hotels and other attractions such as nightclubs, casinos, shops and restaurants. Condado is one of the island's primary tourist destinations.

In recent years, El Condado neighborhood has become associated with wealth and status. Properties are scarce, hard to come by and extremely expensive. It is sometimes called the “Manhattan of Puerto Rico” and properties tend to hover in the millions of dollars. It is one of the most desirable places to live on the island and as such commands a premium.

20th century

Condado began its process of urbanization in 1908 by two American industrialists, Hernan and Sosthenes, also known as the Behn Brothers. The quarter became a typical streetcar suburb to the traditional urban center of Old San Juan. Its growth and development was mostly shaped by a transportation influenced suburbanization developed on a grid plan.

The neighborhood experienced an economic boom in the first decades of the 20th century when some of the wealthiest families built their homes in the area. The Vanderbilts built a summer home in 1919 which today has been converted into the luxurious Condado Vanderbilt Hotel. The Behn Brothers also built their home in Condado and to their memory, Dos Hermanos Bridge (or "Two Brothers Bridge" in English) is named in their honor as founders of Puerto Rico Telephone and the new electric tramway line that linked the county to Old San Juan.

The 1950s-60s era saw another boom in Condado, with the rapid industrialization of Puerto Rico, this flamboyant locale was becoming a popular tourist destination. Large hotels like the Caribe Hilton Hotel and La Concha Resort were built as part of a government sponsorship program under the Operation Bootstrap brand.

A convention center was built to host activities while many families began to move in during the development of high-end and high-rise apartment buildings. In fact, Ashford Avenue was named after another well-known Condado resident Dr. Bailey Ashford. It runs through the subbarrio and leads toward the Puente Dos Hermanos.

Demographics
In 2010, Condado had a population of 4,908 and a population density of 15,832.3 persons per square mile.

21st century

Condado looks quite different from what it did at the turn of the century. Some of the luxurious homes which still remain nestled between the high-rise condominiums have been converted into small inns, shops, museums or restaurants. Dr. Bailey Ashford's home has been remodeled and there are plans to turn it into a museum. Condado's main public space is La Ventana al Mar, designed by architect and urbanist Andrés Mignucci. The park is flanked by two of Condado's landmark hotels: to the west by the Condado Vanderbilt Hotel (1919), designed by Warren and Whitmore, and to the east by the La Concha Hotel (1957), designed by Toro Ferrer.

One of the first schools constructed by the United States is in Condado. Designed by Antonin Nechodoma, it was designated as a historic site in November 2020 by the Puerto Rico Planning Board.

Public transportation
Condado is served by the Puerto Rico Metropolitan Bus Authority with two bus routes: T21 and D53.

Gallery

See also 
 
 Condado Beach
 List of communities in Puerto Rico

References

External links

 
Streetcar suburbs
Santurce, San Juan, Puerto Rico